The 1996 World Wrestling Championships were held in Sofia, Bulgaria.

Medal table

Team ranking

Medal summary

Women's freestyle

Participating nations
105 competitors from 20 nations participated.

 (3)
 (3)
 (2)
 (9)
 (9)
 (4)
 (9)
 (1)
 (1)
 (7)
 (4)
 (2)
 (4)
 (9)
 (5)
 (6)
 (9)
 (5)
 (5)
 (8)

See also
 Wrestling at the 1996 Summer Olympics

References

Results

External links
UWW Database

World Wrestling Championships
W
W
W